John Garnet Carter (Feb. 9, 1883, in Sweetwater, Tennessee – July 21, 1954) was an American inventor and entrepreneur who is considered one of the fathers of miniature golf. In 1927, Carter was the first to patent a version of the game which he called "Tom Thumb Golf". His course was built on Lookout Mountain in Georgia where Carter owned a hotel. Within a few years, thousands of Tom Thumb courses opened all over the United States. Carter eventually sold the rights to his patent and used his fortune to found the Rock City Gardens.

References

1883 births
1954 deaths
Lookout Mountain
People from Sweetwater, Tennessee
20th-century American inventors
20th-century American businesspeople
Businesspeople from Tennessee